Albert Pobor (29 May 1956 – 3 March 2022) was a Croatian football manager. He died on 3 March 2022, at the age of 65.

As a player, he won the 1988 Marshal Tito Cup with Borac Banja Luka.

He worked as a scout and youth coach at Dinamo Zagreb from February 2018 to the end of August 2021.

Managerial statistics

References

External links

 

1956 births
2022 deaths
People from Novi Grad, Bosnia and Herzegovina
Croats of Bosnia and Herzegovina
Yugoslav footballers
FK Borac Banja Luka players
Yugoslav First League players
Croatian football managers
HŠK Posušje managers
Cerezo Osaka managers
NK Hrvatski Dragovoljac managers
HNK Segesta managers
J1 League managers
Croatian expatriate football managers
Croatian expatriate sportspeople in Japan
Expatriate football managers in Japan
Croatian expatriate sportspeople in Slovenia
Expatriate football managers in Slovenia
GNK Dinamo Zagreb non-playing staff